Banu Güven (born 1969) is a Turkish journalist. She worked at NTV for 14 years (1997–2011), presenting programmes such as Gecen Hafta – Bu Hafta and 24 Saat. She has been a foreign correspondent for Milliyet, and writes for Radikal.

"She resigned after working for NTV for 14 years due to disputes over some of the guests in her TV programme, ‘Banu Guven’le Arti’. One of her guests, novelist Vedat Turkali, speaking about the Kurdish issue in Turkey made some direct reference to imprisoned PKK leader Abdullah Ocalan, and a programme with Kurdish parliamentarian Leyla Zana was not allowed to be conducted on NTV."

Güven was a member of the jury for the 2012 Metin Göktepe Journalism Awards.

References

External links
 www.banuguven.com
 https://twitter.com/banuguven

1969 births
Living people
Diplomats from Istanbul
Television people from Istanbul